La Salle Explorers basketball may refer to either of the basketball teams that represent La Salle University:

La Salle Explorers men's basketball
La Salle Explorers women's basketball